Jim Lawson (born February 19, 1960) is an American comic book writer and artist best known for his work on the Teenage Mutant Ninja Turtles series. Lawson created the Rat King and also co-created the series Planet Racers with Peter Laird. He is also the writer/artist of the black-and white-comic series Paleo: Tales of the Late Cretaceous. For more than 20 years he was a writer and artist of TMNT comics, but in 2009 he announced that he would depart from TMNT following Peter Laird's sale of the property to Viacom.

Lawson graduated from Housatonic Valley Regional High School.

Career
In 2013 Lawson launched a Kickstarter campaign to fund a new project, a graphic novel series called Dragonfly.

Lawson was a participant in the 1988 drafting of the Creators' Bill of Rights.

On February 19, 2019, Lawson launched a Kickstarter campaign for his independent graphic novel and trade paperback, Dragonfly and Hellride. The campaign offered a reward for $1500, to the buyer who received the book's property rights.

References

External links

Official site
Jim Lawson's blog

"Comic creator: Jim Lawson". Lambiek Comiclopedia.

Living people
American comics artists
Mirage Studios
1960 births
Housatonic Valley Regional High School alumni